The 2016 Internationaux de Tennis de Vendée was a professional tennis tournament played on hard courts. It was the fourth edition of the tournament which was part of the 2016 ATP Challenger Tour. It took place in Mouilleron-le-Captif, France between 7 and 13 November 2016.

Singles main-draw entrants

Seeds

 1 Rankings are as of October 31, 2016.

Other entrants
The following players received wildcards into the singles main draw:
  Mikhail Youzhny
  Geoffrey Blancaneaux
  Corentin Moutet
  Benoît Paire

The following player entered the main draw using a special exemption:
  Alex De Minaur

The following players received entry from the qualifying draw:
  Adrien Bossel
  Rémi Boutillier
  Calvin Hemery
  Antoine Hoang

Champions

Singles

 Julien Benneteau def.  Andrey Rublev, 7–5, 2–6, 6–3.

Doubles

 Jonathan Eysseric /  Édouard Roger-Vasselin def.  Johan Brunström /  Andreas Siljeström 6–7(1–7), 7–6(7–3), [11–9].

References

External links
Official Website

Internationaux de Tennis de Vendee
Internationaux de Tennis de Vendée